The Kennedy Bridge is the main crossing for the Niger River in Niamey, Niger. It was built in 1970, and named for United States President John F. Kennedy.  Its construction enabled Niamey to expand onto the right bank of the river to the west.  On 9 February 1990, a confrontation between students of the University of Niamey and police on the bridge left 20 civilians dead, and hastened the end of the military regime led by General Ali Saibou.

References

Britannica online.
Remo Capra Bloise.  Bridge Over Niger: The True Story of the J. F. Kennedy Bridge. AuthorHouse (2000) 
James Decalo. Historical Dictionary of Niger. Scarecrow Press/ Metuchen. NJ - London (1979) 

Bridges in Niger
Buildings and structures in Niamey
Transport in Niamey
Crossings of the Niger River
Bridges completed in 1970